Three Lives may refer to:

 Three Lives (book), a 1909 book by Gertrude Stein
 "Three Lives" (short story), a short story by Pu Songling
 Three Lives (film), a 1924 Georgian silent film
 Three Lives, a 1971 American documentary film directed by Kate Millett
 Three Lives & Company, a bookstore in Manhattan

See also